Penitencia Creek is a light rail station operated by Santa Clara Valley Transportation Authority (VTA).  This station is served by VTA's Orange Line.

The station was opened on June 24, 2004, as part of VTA's Capitol light rail extension.

Service

Location 
Penitencia Creek station is located in the median of North Capitol Avenue, just south of Penitencia Creek Road in San Jose, California.

Station layout

References

External links 

Santa Clara Valley Transportation Authority light rail stations
Santa Clara Valley Transportation Authority bus stations
Railway stations in San Jose, California
Railway stations in the United States opened in 2004
2004 establishments in California